Mudhal Thethi in Tamil, Modala Thedi in Kannada is an Indian bilingual film, directed by P. Neelakantan and produced by B. R. Panthulu. This was the first film produced by Panthulu under Padmini Pictures banner. The Tamil version starred Sivaji Ganesan, Anjali Devi, N. S. Krishnan and T. A. Madhuram in lead roles. The film had musical score by T. G. Lingappa scoring for his first feature film. The film was a remake of Hindi film Paheli Tarikh (1954).

The film was simultaneously shot in Kannada retaining the same crew members with a slight change in the main star cast. The Kannada version titled Modala Thedi starred Panthulu, M. V. Rajamma, Dikki Madhava Rao and Chi. Sadashivaiah. The movie follows the narrative theme of the 1946 movie It's a Wonderful Life.

Plot 
Sivagnanam works as a bank clerk.  Though his pay is meagre, he deals with a lot of cash at the bank. His family consists of wife Lakshmi, a daughter whose marriage is being negotiated and two school going children. The bank where he works crashes. Sivagnanam is unable to find another job.

Dejected, he tries to kill himself so that his insurance money would be made available to the family. His soul reaches the court of Yama, the god of death. Angered by what he deals an irresponsible act, Yama sends him back to earth to see the result of his death. He is able to observe the goings on but is unable to participate. He watches his son being picked up by the police for stealing food, his daughter is molested and his wife drowns herself in a well after murdering the rapist. He realizes his mistake. Thankfully the whole series of events has been a dream.

Cast

Tamil version 
Sivaji Ganesan as Sivagnanam
Anjali Devi as Lakshmi
N. S. Krishnan as Sathanandam
T. A. Madhuram as Saanthamma
K. D. Santhanam
Srirangam Rangamani
P. Susheela
Rajagopal
'Baby' Uma as Sushila

Kannada version 
 B. R. Panthulu
 M. V. Rajamma
 Dikki Madhava Rao
 Chi. Sadashivaiah
 Master Hirannaiah
 Sivaji Ganesan (guest appearance)

Production 
Muthal Thethi was produced by B. R. Panthulu, as the maiden venture of his production company Padmini Pictures. The film is based on a story by Dada Mirasee and the screenplay and dialogue are by P. Neelakantan, who directed the Tamil version. The film was based on a Hindi film, Paheli Tarikh. The music was composed by T. G. Lingappa and the lyrics were penned by K. D. Santhanam and Udumalai Narayana Kavi. V. Ramamurthi was the cinematographer, with audiography by V. S. Raghavan. Art direction was by the veteran A. K. Sekhar, and make-up and costumes were by Hari Babu and M. G. Naidu respectively. The film was edited by Devarajan. The film was shot at Revathi Studios, and was backed by the veteran A. L. Srinivasan, under his banner, Madras Pictures.

Soundtrack 
The music was composed by T. G. Lingappa. Lyrics were by K. D. Santhanam and Udumalai Narayana Kavi. Singers are N. S. Krishnan & T. A. Madhuram. Playback singers are M. M. Dandapani Desikar, T. V. Rathnam, K. Rani and A. P. Komala.

Tamil Track listing

Kannada Track listing

References

External links 
 
 History 31 – 1955 : The Year Of Star Debuts

1950s multilingual films
1950s Tamil-language films
1955 films
Films directed by P. Neelakantan
Films scored by T. G. Lingappa
Hindu mythology in popular culture
Indian multilingual films
Kannada remakes of Hindi films
1950s Kannada-language films
Tamil remakes of Hindi films
Indian black-and-white films